Víctor Rodríguez Núñez (born in Havana, 1955) is a Cuban poet, journalist, literary critic and translator.

In addition to Cuba, he has lived in Nicaragua, Colombia, and the United States, where he is currently a Professor of Spanish at Kenyon College.

Poetry

Rodríguez Núñez has published over twenty books of poetry, including:

Cayama (Santiago de Cuba: Uvero, 1979)
Con raro olor a mundo (Havana: Unión, 1981)
Noticiario del solo (Havana: Letras Cubanas, 1987)
Cuarto de desahogo (Havana: Unión, 1993)
Los poemas de nadie y otros poemas (Intro. Juan Manuel Roca. Medellín: Tecnológico de Antioquia, 1994)
El último a la feria (San José de Costa Rica: EDUCA, 1995)
Oración inconclusa (Seville: Renacimiento, 2000)
Con raro olor a mundo: Primera antología (Havana: Unión, 2004)
Actas de medianoche I (Valladolid: Junta de Castilla y León, 2006)
Actas de medianoche II (Soria: Diputación Provincial de Soria, 2007)
Todo buen corazón es un prismático: Antología poética, 1975-2005. Intro.Juan Gelman. (Mexico: La Cabra Ediciones-UANL, 2010)
Intervenciones: Antología poética. Ed. and Intro. Juan Carlos Abril. (Santander [Spain]: La Mirada Creadora, 2010)
tareas (Seville: Renacimiento, 2011)
reversos (Madrid: Visor, 2011)
reversos (Guadalajara: Mantis Editores-Escritores de Cajeme, 2011)
 thaw/deshielos. Trans. Katherine Hedeen. Todmorden: Arc Publications, 2013.
 desde un granero rojo. Madrid: Hiperión, 2013.
 Cuarto de desahogo: Antología personal, 1975-2010. Havana: Letras Cubanas, 2013.
 deshielos. Granada: Valparaíso Ediciones, 2014.
 desde un granero rojo: poesía reciente. Quito: ElÁngelEditor, 2014.

Poetry awards

Rodríguez Núñez has won numerous prizes for his poetry:

David Prize (Cuba, 1980)
Plural Prize (Mexico, 1983)
EDUCA Prize (Costa Rica, 1995)
Renacimiento Prize (Spain, 2000)
Fray Luis de León Prize, Accésit (Spain, 2005)
Leonor Prize (Spain, 2006)
Rincón de la Victoria Prize (Spain, 2010)
Jaime Gil de Biedma Prize, Accésit (Spain, 2011)
 Alfons el Magnànim Poetry Prize (Spain, 2013)

Poetry in translation

Collections of Rodríguez Núñez’s poetry has been translated into the following languages:

English (The Infinite’s Ash, trans. by Katherine Hedeen, Todmorden: Arc Publications, 2008, Every Good Heart Is a Telescope, trans. by Hedeen, Toad Press, 2013, and With a Strange Scent of World, trans. by Hedeen, Diálogos Books, 2014)
French (L’étrange odeur du monde, trans. by Jean Portante, Paris: L’Oreille du Loup, 2011)
Italian (L’ultimo alla fiera, trans. by Emilio Coco, Foggia: Sentieri Meridiani, 2011)
Serbian (Свако добро срце има облик призме, trans. by Радивоје Константиновић, Novisad: Adresa, 2014)
Swedish (Världen ryms i en alexandrin, trans. by Lasse Söderberg, Malmö: Aura Latina, 2011)

A wide selection of his poetry has also been translated into Arabic, Dutch, German, Hungarian, Lithuanian, Macedonian, Portuguese, Russian, and Slovenian.

Cultural journalism

During the eighties Rodríguez Núñez wrote for and was the editor of El Caimán Barbudo, one of Cuba’s leading cultural magazines, where he published dozens of articles on literature and film. A selection of his interviews with Hispanic poets appears in La poesía sirve para todo (Havana: Unión, 2008).

He is currently the assistant director of the Mexican cultural journal, La Otra.

Literary criticism

Rodríguez Núñez has compiled three influential anthologies that have defined his poetic generation:

Cuba: En su lugar la poesía (Mexico: U Autónoma Metropolitana-Azcapotzalco, 1982)
Usted es la culpable: Nueva poesía cubana (Havana: Editora Abril, 1985)
El pasado del cielo: La nueva y novísima poesía cubana (Medellín: Alejandría Editores, 1994)

Most recently, he introduced and compiled a major anthology of 20th century poetry in Cuba, Poesía cubana: Antología esencial, for the Spanish publisher Visor (Madrid: 2011).

His book-length study on Gabriel García Márquez’s non-fiction, Cien años de solidaridad (Havana: Unión, 1986) was awarded the Enrique José Varona Prize in 1986.

Rodríguez Núñez has published various critical editions, introductions, and essays on Spanish American poets including:

Oh, smog: Antología poética [with Katherine M. Hedeen]. By Juan Calzadilla. (Havana: Arte y Literatura, 2008)
Poesía. By Francisco Urondo (Havana: Casa de las Américas, 2006)
Oda a Rubén Darío: Poemas selectos. By José Coronel Urtecho. (Caracas: Biblioteca Ayacucho, 2005)
La soledad de América Latina: Escritos sobre arte y literatura, 1948-1988. By Gabriel García Márquez. (Havana: Arte y Literatura, 1989)
Cinco puntos cardinales. By Z. Valdés, J. A. Mazzotti, E. Llanos Melussa, J. R. Saravia and A. Desiderato. (Havana: Casa de las Américas, 1989)
País secreto. By Juan Manuel Roca. (Havana: Casa de las Américas, 1987)

Translation

Rodríguez Núñez is also a translator.

From Spanish into English, titles include:

Esto sucede cuando el corazón de una mujer se rompe. By Margaret Randall. (Madrid: Hiperion, 1999)
El silo: Una sinfonía pastoral [with Katherine Hedeen]. By John Kinsella. (Havana: Arte y Literatura, 2005)
América o el resplandor [with Katherine Hedeen]. By John Kinsella. (Havana: Torre de Letras, 2006 and Mexico: Mantis, 2013)
En esa redonda nación de sangre: Poesía indígena estadounidense contemporánea [with Katherine Hedeen]. Intro. Janet McAdams. (Mexico: La Cabra-CONACULTA, 2011 and Havana: Arte y Literatura, 2013)
La vida incesante y otros poemas [with Katherine Hedeen]. By Mark Strand. (Mexico: El Tucán de Virginia, 2013)

From Spanish into English:

The Poems of Sidney West [with Katherine Hedeen]. By Juan Gelman. (Cambridge: Salt Publishing, 2009)
Diary with No Subject [with Katherine Hedeen]. By Juan Calzadilla. (Cambridge: Salt Publishing, 2009)
Garden of Silica [with Katherine Hedeen]. By Ida Vitale. (Cambridge: Salt Publishing, 2010)
Blue Coyote with Guitar [with Katherine Hedeen]. By Juan Bañuelos. (Cambridge: Salt Publishing, 2010)
The Bridges [with Katherine Hedeen]. By Fayad Jamís. (Cambridge: Salt Publishing, 2011)
 Friday in Jerusalem and Other Poems [with Katherine Hedeen]. By Marco Antonio Campos. (Cromer: Salt Publishing, 2012)
 The World So Often: Poems 1982-2008 [with Katherine Hedeen]. By Luis García Montero. (Cromer: Salt Publishing, 2013)

He is an Associate Editor for Salt Publishing’s Earthwork’s Series of Latin American Poetry in Translation.

Interviews, essays and reviews
José Ángel Leyva. “Víctor Rodríguez Núñez: La poesía es algo más que literatura”. La Otra 14 (Oct.-Dec. 2011): 39-47.
Roberto Méndez Martínez. “Víctor Rodríguez Núñez: Hacia la medianoche”. La Otra 14 (Oct.-Dec. 2011): 49-51.
Hugo Mujica. “Todo está al otro lado de la noche”. Cuadernos Hispanoamericanos 736 (Oct. 2011): 103-114.
Armando Chávez Rivera. “Víctor Rodríguez Núñez: Escobamarga y curujeyes”. Cuba per se: Cartas de la diáspora. Cincuenta escritores cubanos responden sobre su vida fuera de la Isla. Miami: Universal, 2009. 479-488.
Reina María Rodríguez. “Las Actas de medianoche de VRN”. Actas de medianoche y otros poemas. By Rodríguez Núñez. Havana: Torre de Letras, 2008. 5-9.
Juan Manuel Roca. “Postal de medianoche”. Los poemas de nadie y otros poemas. By Rodríguez Núñez. Medellin: Tecnológico de Antioquia, 1994.

References

External links
Author's Page at Arc Publications
Author's Page at Lavender Ink/Diálogos
Kenyon College Faculty Page
Salt Publishing's Earthworks Series
Poems: Asymptote, January 2014
Essay: Los Angeles Review of Books, Juan Gelman or "about a truth that didn't believe in death"
Interview: Asymptote, 2014
Poems: InTranslation, Brooklyn Rail, 2012
La Otra
La Otra: Yo Poeta
Arc Publications Blog I
Arc Publications Blog II
Poems: Prometeo
Poems: La Otra
Poems: in Hungarian
Essay: Juan Gelman o "Los hielos de la furia" in La Jornada
Interview: Víctor Rodríguez Núñez: El poeta sin pedestal in UIC
Review: "Con olor a buena poesía" by Carlos Espinosa Domínguez in Encuentro en la Red
Video: Reading at Manchester Literary Festival, 2011
Video: Reading at O'Miami Poetry Festival, 2011
Video: Reading at Granada, Nicaragua's International Poetry Festival, 2011
Video: Reading at Granada, Nicaragua's International Poetry Festival, 2009
Video: Reading from Deshielo
Video: Poesía en su propia voz
Video: Reading at the Medellín International Poetry Festival, 2008

Rodriguez Nunez, Victor
Rodriguez Nunez, Victor
Rodriguez Nunez, Victor
Rodriguez Nunez, Victor
Rodriguez Nunez, Victor
Rodriguez Nunez, Victor
Living people
1955 births